Football in Southern Italy in 1920–21 was still organized at an experimental and amatorial level.

The tournaments were organized in three regions, Tuscany, Latium and Campania. Differently from the pre-war period, six clubs advanced to a general final tournament.

Qualifications

Tuscany

Classification

Results table 

Relegation playoff
Played on 25 June 1921 in Lucca.

Lazio

Classification

Results table

Campania

Group A 
Classification

Results table

Group B 
Classification

Results table

Final round 
Classification

Results table

Semifinals

Group A

Classification

Results table

Group B

Classification

Results table

Final
Played on 3 July 1921 in Bologna.

Livorno resigned from the FIGC.

Footnotes

See also
Football in Southern Italy in 1919–20

Football in Italy